Yves "Balak" Bigerel (born 1 January 1979) is a French comics artist and animator. He is mostly known in France for the comic book series Lastman. In 2009, Balak invented a new digital comics narrative technique which he called "turbomedia"; his work was noticed by Marvel editor Joe Quesada, who recruited him to help establish the Marvel digital imprint "Infinite Comics".

Biography
Bigerel initially studied philosophy, before completing a three-year course at Gobelins Cinéma Department of Animation in 2006.  With Bastien Vivès and Michaël Sanlaville, he created in 2013 the French manga Lastman. The series won the 2015 Angoulême International Comics Festival Prix de la Série, and an animated adaptation has appeared on France 4.

He was present at the Bataclan during the November 2015 Paris attacks, but survived unharmed.

References

French artists
French cartoonists
French comics artists
French animators
French erotic artists
French surrealist artists
Living people
1979 births